Zhang Chengxiang (Pinyin: Zhāng Chéngxiáng;  born 25 January 1989) is a Chinese footballer currently playing for China League Two side Heilongjiang Lava Spring as a forward.

Club career
Zhang joined Changsha Ginde youth team system in the early year and was promoted to first team squad in 2007. On 7 April 2007, he made his Super League debut in a 4–2 away defeat against Shandong Luneng Taishan, coming on as a substitute for Li Zhenhong in the 80th minute. Playing as a substitute striker, Zhang made just 26 appearances for Changsha Ginde between 2007 and 2010. His first senior goal came on 14 August 2010, in a 3–2 away defeat against Tianjin Teda.

After Changsha Ginde relegated to second-tier league in the end of 2010 season, Zhang transferred to Super League club Shaanxi Chanba in December 2010 with his elder brother Zhang Chenglin. However, he failed to establish himself  within the first team and played mostly in the reserve team league. He followed the club to move to Guizhou in 2012. On 4 July 2012, he made his debut for Guizhou Renhe in the third round of 2012 Chinese FA Cup which Guizhou beat Guangdong Sunray Cave 2–0 at Guiyang Olympic Centre. Along with Wang Erzhuo and Liao Linkun, Zhang was loaned to China League Two club Shaanxi Laochenggen for the rest of the season in mid-July. He scored 5 goals in the Group Stage as Shaanxi Laochenggen finished 4th place in the North Group and entered the play-offs stage. However, Shaanxi lost to Guizhou Zhicheng 2–0 on aggregate in the quarter-finals and failed to promote to China League One. In March 2013, Shaanxi Laochenggen extended Zhang's loan deal for one year.

In March 2015, Zhang transferred to China League Two side Tianjin Locomotive. He moved to fellow China League Two side Heilongjiang Lava Spring in March 2016.

Personal life
Zhang Chengxiang's elder brother, Zhang Chenglin, is also a professional footballer. They played together at Changsha Ginde (2007–2010) and Guizhou Renhe (2011–2014).

Career statistics 
Statistics accurate as of match played 5 November 2017.

References

Living people
1989 births
People from Bengbu
Chinese footballers
Footballers from Anhui
Changsha Ginde players
Beijing Renhe F.C. players
Heilongjiang Ice City F.C. players
Chinese Super League players
Association football forwards